Scaligera Basket Verona, known for sponsorship reasons as Tezenis Verona, is an Italian professional basketball club based in Verona, Italy. It competes in the LBA.

History

1951–1982: Decades within the minor leagues
Scaligera Basket was founded in Verona in 1951. From 1951 until 1971, Scaligera took part in local and regional competitions within the minor leagues of Italian basketball. In the early 1970s, a local entrepreneur, Giuseppe Vicenzi became the new owner of the club and sponsored the team Vicenzi Biscotti, which became one of the most recognizable name for Scaligera. In the 1976–77 season, Scaligera reached the Serie B. Despite a relegation to Serie C in the following season, the club was able to re-gain the promotion in 1977–78. After a few years in Serie B, in the 1982–83 season, under the leadership of coach Bruno Arrigoni, Verona was promoted to Serie A2, the second division of Italian basketball.

1982–1991: Years in Serie A2 and the Italian Cup
In the first year of Serie A2, Scaligera had to play in Padua due to the lack of a sports hall in Verona and was relegated to Serie B. However, the team re-gained the Serie A2 in 1986 by returning to Verona. The team was sponsored by Citrosil, a product of Glaxo, a pharmaceutical company whose Italian headquarters was located in Verona and which, thanks to the determination of its president Mario Fertonani, decided to support the Vicenzi family. The 1987 relegation was immediately followed by the promotion to Serie A2 in 1988, when the team was directly sponsored by Glaxo. In 1989, Alberto Bucci became the new head coach of the team, however, Scaligera failed in reaching the promotion in the 1989–90 season.

The years in Serie A2 ended with the 1990–91 championship which was characterized by the first and historic promotion to Serie A1 and, above all, with the victory of the Italian Basketball Cup, Scaligera's first ever trophy. On 21 February 1991, Scaligera won the Cup for 97–85 against Philips Milano. This success went down in the annals of Italian basketball, as it was the first and so far the only national cup won by a team from the second league. The most important players of that fantastic season were Russ Schoene, Tim Kempton, Sandro Brusamarello, Giampiero Savio, Riccardo Morandotti and Paolo Moretti, as well as, the young Italian power forward Alessandro Frosini.

1991–2002: At the top of Italian basketball
During the summer, coach Bucci left the club, being hired by Scavolini Pesaro, but Scaligera failed in finding a valuable substitute to coach Bucci and the 1991–92 championship ended with a relegation to Serie A2. However, under coach Franco Marcelletti the club was immediately promoted in the following season, thanks to important players like Alessandro Frosini, Davide Bonora, Henry Williams, Sylvester Gray and Giacomo Galanda. In 1993–94, the team arrived fourth in the regular season and, after having ousted 2–0 Olimpia Milano in the quarterfinals, Verona was eliminated by Virtus Bologna in the semifinals by 2–1; the team also reached the Italian Cup final, which lost against Benetton Treviso. In 1995, the club signed the American pointguard Mike Iuzzolino. In the 1995–96, Marcelletti's team, was able to reach the Italian Cup final once again; however, it lost against Milano.

Current roster

Honours & achievements
Total titles: (5)

Domestic competitions
 Italian Cup
 Winners (1): 1990-91
 Italian Supercup
 Winners (1): 1996
 Italian LNP Cup
 Winners (1): 2014-15
 Lega Basket Serie A2 
 Winners (1): 2021-22

European competitions
 FIBA Saporta Cup Runners-up (1): 1996-97
 FIBA Korać Cup Winners (1)''': 1997-98

Notable players

References

External links
Official Website 
Eurobasket.com Team Profile

1951 establishments in Italy
Basketball teams established in 1951
Basketball teams in Veneto